David Li (born 1939) is a Hong Kong banker and politician.

David Li may also refer to:
David H. Li (born 1928), Chinese professor and author of books on the culture of China
David Daokui Li (born 1963), Chinese economist
David X. Li (born in 1960s), Chinese quantitative analyst and qualified actuary

See also
David Lee (disambiguation)
Li (surname)